Shariful Haque (born January 15, 1976, Mymensingh District, Dhaka) is a former Bangladeshi cricketer who played in one ODI in 1998.

His career ended when he was given an indefinite ban by the Bangladesh Cricket Board (BCB) in 2012 after he was found guilty of spot-fixing in a Bangladesh Premier League match. The Dhaka Gladiators captain Mashrafe Mortaza had earlier reported to his team management a spot-fixing approach by a cricketer.

References 

1976 births
Living people
Bangladesh One Day International cricketers
Bangladeshi cricketers
Biman Bangladesh Airlines cricketers
Cricketers banned for corruption